Monk Suite: Kronos Quartet Plays Music of Thelonious Monk is a studio album by the Kronos Quartet. The album contains compositions by Thelonious Monk,. The quartet is joined by Ron Carter (bass) on "Off Minor/Epistrophy" and by Chuck Israels (bass) and Eddie Marshall (drums) on the Duke Ellington composition "Black and Tan Fantasy". It was re-released in 2005 as CD, on Savoy, and re-issued with Music of Bill Evans on 2CD as 32 Jazz: The Complete Landmark Sessions.

Track listing

See also
List of 1985 albums

References

1985 albums
Kronos Quartet albums
Landmark Records albums
Thelonious Monk tribute albums
Savoy Records albums
Instrumental albums